Worden Academy is a coeducational secondary school with academy status, located in Leyland, in the South Ribble district of Lancashire, England.

It opened in 1955 as Worden County Secondary School, and became Worden High School in 1972 with the introduction of the Comprehensive System to Lancashire and the abolition of the 11-plus examination. The school was renamed Worden Sports College when it became a specialist Sports College. The school converted to academy status in February 2013 and was renamed Worden Academy.

Developments
In the early 1990s, the ROSLA block was gradually sold off to the Westfield Centre, with a major extension to the building being completed by 2003. The first Worden Sports College web site went live on 6 March 1996. Online newspaper "Making The News" goes live October 2005.  The new Virtual Learning Environment (VLE) Moodle went live July 2006.  
2004 the school field had a new £150,000 field drainage system put in.

The Sports Hall and entrance were refurbished as a result of the Sports College status. Subsequently, two classrooms were knocked together to form the first air-conditioned computer suite followed by the second suite in September 2006. The third computer suite followed later that year.

A refurbished £500,000 Science Block (The Newton Suite) was officially opened on 28 September 2007 by the Mayor of South Ribble and Suzanne Hall (Hollyoaks actress).

September 2010 saw the launch of the new school web site and school logo.

Headteachers

House system

The original house system, used the names of local rivers: Shaw, Lostock, Bannister and Atherton. After many years of no house system, 2005 saw the house system relaunched.  The students and staff are divided into four houses Dragon (red), Griffin (blue), Phoenix (yellow) and Unicorn (green). Five trophies are presented each year: House Point Cup, Competition Shield, Attendance Shield, Sports Day Cup.  Each winner of one of the previous four trophies is awarded four points, second place gets three points etc. The house with the most points is awarded the Championship Cup. In 2018, their houses were changed to Windsor (red), Kensington (yellow), Clarence (green) and Balmoral (blue).

National competitions
In 2004, together with the Wellcome Trust, the BBC launched a national photographic competition inviting entries on the theme of 'How is Science changing us?' The competition focused specifically on developments in bio-medical technology and was open to both individuals and group entries from schools. The team's entry was awarded RUNNERS UP prize in the schools section, winning £1000 of photographic equipment for the school and £50 worth of equipment for each pupil involved. They were invited to the Royal Albert Hall, London, to collect their prize. All photos will be part of a national exhibition that will tour six venues around the country.

World record
61 boys and girls from Worden took part in a 'keepy uppy' world record attempt on 26 April 2006. It was organised by the England fans and The FA with over 650 schoolchildren from 16 schools throughout England taking part. The officials were in constant radio contact with each school, to make sure every pupil could keep the footballs in the air for ten seconds.  459 pupils managed to keep the footballs in the air at the same time to beat the previous record of 446 which had stood for the last seven years.

Notes

References
Cooper, Andrin (2006) New record set, The Football Association, online news 26 April [accessed 14 July 2007]
Gee, Chris (2006) Sven thanks pupils for keeping up a record, The Citizen, online news 4 May [accessed 14 July 2007]
Leyland Guardian (2007) School's first head dies at 95, online news 3 May, [accessed 17 July 2007]
Wellcome Trust (2005) Schools Runner Up : Worden Sports College, Lancashire, "Imagine" – Winners' Gallery online, [accessed 14 July 2007]

External links
 Worden Sports College Website
 Worden Sports College Online Newspaper
 Worden Sports College Radio Broadcast
 Worden Sports College OFSTED report
 Leyland Society of Engineers

Schools in South Ribble
Educational institutions established in 1955
Secondary schools in Lancashire
1955 establishments in England
Academies in Lancashire
Leyland, Lancashire